Dąbrówka Osuchowska is a village in the administrative district of Gmina Czermin, within Mielec County, Subcarpathian Voivodeship, in south-eastern Poland.

The village has a population of 340.

References

Villages in Mielec County